Rocks The Blues is the first album credited to musician Ike Turner. Released in 1963 from Crown Records, it contains mostly previously released singles from the 1950s.

Content and release 
After the release of "Rocket 88" in 1951, Ike Turner became a session musician and production assistant for the Bihari brothers at Modern Records. They also contracted him as a talent scout to exploit his connections in the Delta Blues scene. Unaware of songwriter's royalties, Turner was also paid to write new material which they copyrighted under their own names. A majority of the tracks on Rocks The Blues were written by Turner, but credited to him and the Bihari brothers. The Biharis were not songwriters, they used pseudonyms for songwriting credits: Julius Bihari was credited as Jules Taub, Joseph Bihari as Joe Josea, and Saul Bihari as Sam Ling.

The album starts off with the blues rock instrumental "Hey Miss Tina" and culminates with a nearly 9-minute blues medley titled "All The Blues, All The Time" for the closing song. Dennis Binder is the lead vocalist on "I Miss You So" and "Nobody Wants Me." "Cubano Jump," "Loosely," "Cuban Getaway," and "Go To It" which were originally released on Flair Records in 1954, have a different title on this album.

Rocks The Blues was released on Crown Records, a subsidiary of Modern Records. By the time the album was released in 1963, Turner had already had a string of hit records as half of the R&B duo Ike & Tina Turner.

Reissues 
Rocks The Blues was reissued by P-Vine Records as a 2-CD compilation in 2003. It features many more recordings from Ike Turner & The Kings of Rhythm.

Track listing 

Songs included in "All The Blues, All The Time" medley:

"Feelin' Good" by Little Junior Parker's Blue Flames

"Love My Baby" by Little Junior Parker's Blue Flames

"Please Love Me" by B.B. King and His Orchestra

"Boogie Chillen" by John Lee Hooker

"Dust My Broom" by Robert Johnson; also recorded by Elmore James

"Rockin' and Rollin'" aka "Rock Me Baby" by Melvin "Lil' Son" Jackson; also recorded by B.B. King

"Hoochie Coochie Man" by Willie Dixon; also recorded by Muddy Waters

"Woke Up This Morning" by B.B. King and His Orchestra

References 

1963 albums
Ike Turner albums
Albums produced by Ike Turner
Crown Records albums
Rock-and-roll albums